Ali Idir (born 22 December 1966) is an Algerian judoka. He competed in the men's extra-lightweight event at the 1988 Summer Olympics.

References

External links
 

1966 births
Living people
Algerian male judoka
Olympic judoka of Algeria
Judoka at the 1988 Summer Olympics
Place of birth missing (living people)
21st-century Algerian people